Dante's Dream (full title Dante's Dream at the Time of the Death of Beatrice) is a painting from 1871 by the English Pre-Raphaelite painter Dante Gabriel Rossetti. It hangs in the Walker Art Gallery, Liverpool.

He repeated a composition he had done in watercolour and gouache at a smaller scale in 1856. This is now in Tate Britain, measuring 48.7 cm (19.1 in) by 66.2 cm (26 in).

Rossetti had a lifelong interest in the Italian poet Dante Alighieri.  The painting was inspired by Dante's poem La Vita Nuova. In this poem Dante dreams that he is led to the death-bed of Beatrice Portinari, who was the object of his unfulfilled love.  Dante, in black, stands looking towards the dying Beatrice who is lying on a bed.  Two female figures in green hold a canopy over her.  An angel in red holds Dante's hand and leans forward to kiss Beatrice.

In the painting, Rossetti creates a visionary world with complex symbols.  The symbols include the green clothes of Beatrice's attendants, signifying hope; spring flowers in the foreground symbolising purity; and red doves for love.

It is Rossetti's largest painting.  The model for Beatrice was Jane Morris, the wife of William Morris. Annie Miller, who is thought to have been one of Rossetti's mistresses, posed as a grieving hand maiden. The Walker Art Gallery bought the painting directly from the artist in 1881 for £1575 (equivalent to £ in ).  The acquisition was negotiated by Victorian novelist Hall Caine.  In 1897 it was sent to Berlin to be photographed, but was then noted to be "in a dirty condition".  Again in 1904 the painting was noted to be in "a bad condition" and it was considered that its condition had been worsened by its journey to and from Berlin.  The painting was sent in 1908 to the National Gallery in London to be relined, that is, for a new canvas to be glued to the original.  It was then returned to Liverpool. During the Second World War, it was removed from its stretcher, rolled and stored in the basement of the gallery.  In 1941 the painting was moved, together with other large paintings from the gallery, to Ellesmere College in Shropshire.  It was noted at this time that it had sustained some damage.  Conservation work was carried out on the painting in 1960 and in 1985.

It was examined in 2003 and found to be in good condition, with no evidence of any recurrence of the former problems.

References

External links

All texts and images for Dante's Dream in Rossetti Archive

1871 paintings
Paintings based on works by Dante Alighieri
Paintings about death
Paintings by Dante Gabriel Rossetti
Paintings in the collection of the Walker Art Gallery
Cultural depictions of Dante Alighieri
Angels in art
Works based on La Vita Nuova